The Bliss-Leavitt Mark 7 torpedo was a Bliss-Leavitt torpedo developed and produced by the E. W. Bliss Company and the Naval Torpedo Station in Newport, Rhode Island in 1911.

History
The Mark 7 was a major step in the evolution of the modern torpedo. This innovative design featured the use of steam, generated from water sprayed into the combustion pot along with the fuel. The resulting mixture dramatically boosted the efficiency of the torpedo, leading to markedly improved performance. The Mark 7 torpedo was issued to the US Navy fleet in 1912 and remained in service through World War II. This torpedo was also experimented on as an aircraft-launched weapon in the early 1920s.  It was used on submarines of the K, L, M, N and O classes.  It was also used on seven submarines of the R Class (R-21 through R-27) which were decommissioned in 1924 and 1925.

After 1925, the only class of US Navy submarines armed with 18-inch torpedoes was the O Class.  Seven O boats, out of an original 16, were in commission during World War II.   During the war, all of the O boats were stationed at the New London Submarine Base and served as training platforms.  The service of the Mark 7 torpedo ended when the last O boat was decommissioned in September 1945.

See also
American 18 inch torpedo

References

Aerial torpedoes
Torpedoes of the United States
Bliss-Leavitt torpedoes